Queen Isabella, also known as Queen Isabella (1451–1504), is an outdoor sculpture of Isabella I of Castile, installed outside the Pan American Union Building of the Organization of American States at 17th Street and Constitution Avenue NW in Washington, D.C., in the United States.

See also
 List of public art in Washington, D.C., Ward 2
 Outdoor sculpture in Washington, D.C.

References

External links

 O.A.S. Building: Queen Isabella I statue in Washington, D.C. at dcMemorials
 Queen Isabella (1451–1504) – Washington, D.C. at Waymarking

Monuments and memorials in Washington, D.C.
Monuments and memorials to women
Foggy Bottom
Outdoor sculptures in Washington, D.C.
Sculptures of women in Washington, D.C.
Statues in Washington, D.C.
Statues of Isabella I of Castile